The Akuapem are one of the main ethnic groups of the Akan people living in Ghana. They mostly reside south of the Eastern Region of Ghana.

References

Akan